Basil Feilding, 4th Earl of Denbigh, 3rd Earl of Desmond (1668 – 18 March 1717) was a British peer and member of the House of Lords, styled Viscount Feilding from 1675 to 1685.

Peerage

Fielding inherited the English Earldom of Denbigh  and the Irish Earldom of Desmond in 1685, from William Feilding, 3rd Earl of Denbigh and 2nd Earl of Desmond.

Family
Basil Feilding was born in 1668. He was the son of William Feilding, 3rd Earl of Denbigh, and Mary King,  daughter of Sir Robert King. He married Hester Firebrace, daughter of Sir Basil Firebrace, 1st Baronet and Elizabeth Hough, on 22 June 1695.  They had eight children together, including William Feilding, 5th Earl of Denbigh and 4th Earl of Desmond (1697–1755), who succeeded him. Another son, Charles Feilding, was the father of a naval officer of the same name who was involved in the Affair of Fielding and Bylandt. The earl's daughters included Frances Finch, Countess of Winchilsea and Nottingham. He died on 18 March 1717.

References

1668 births
1717 deaths
Lord-Lieutenants of Leicestershire
English army officers
Basil
Earls of Denbigh
Desmond, Basil Feilding, 3rd Earl of